Habrosaurus (meaning "graceful lizard") is an extinct genus of prehistoric salamanders, and the oldest known member of the family Sirenidae. Two species are known, H. prodilatus from the middle Campanian Dinosaur Park Formation of Alberta, and H. dilatus from the late Maastrichtian and Paleocene of western North America. It is relatively common in the Lance Formation of Wyoming, and less common in the Hell Creek Formation of Montana.

Description 
Habrosaurus was one of the largest lissamphibians of all time, comparable in length to modern giant salamanders at about 1.6 meters, as estimated from its trunk vertebrae length (up to 2 cm long). H. prodilatus possessed chisel-like teeth, while H. dilatus had bulkier crowns. The teeth of H. dilatus also exhibited heavy wear facets while those of H. prodilatus had only mild wear, suggesting that H. dilatus was more adapted for durophagy than H. prodilatus. H. dilatus may have preyed upon arthropods with hard carapaces as well as mollusks.

Classification 

Habrosaurus is a sister taxa to both Pseudobranchus and Siren which are the only genera in the family Sirenidae. Sirenids are classified by their neotenous traits (complete lack of hindlimbs and external gills in both larval and adult states).

References 

Sirenoidea
Prehistoric amphibian genera
Prehistoric salamanders
Late Cretaceous amphibians
Cretaceous amphibians of North America
Late Cretaceous animals of North America
Campanian genus first appearances
Paleocene genus extinctions
Cretaceous–Paleogene boundary
Cretaceous United States
Hell Creek fauna
Lance fauna
Fossil taxa described in 1933
Taxa named by Charles W. Gilmore